Ryūya, Ryuya or Ryuuya (written: 竜也, 龍也, 龍矢, 隆矢 or 柳也) is a masculine Japanese given name. Notable people with the name include:

, Japanese baseball player
, Japanese footballer
, Japanese footballer
, Japanese baseball player
, Japanese actor
, Japanese boxer

Fictional characters 
, a character in the visual novel Air

Japanese masculine given names